The 1967 Campeonato Ecuatoriano de Fútbol was the 9th national championship for football teams in Ecuador. This season marked the first time the national championship was contested as a league and not as a tournament in which teams had to qualified for. With the creation of the Segunda Categoria this same season, a system of promotion and relegation was also implemented. 

El Nacional won their first national title this season, just three years after being founded.

Teams
Ten teams participated this season (home city in parenthesis).

América (Quito)
Barcelona (Guayaquil)
El Nacional (Quito)
Emelec (Guayaquil)
Español (Guayaquil)
LDU Quito (Quito)
Macará (Ambato)
Manta Sport (Manta)
Patria (Guayaquil)
Politécnico (Quito)

Standings

Results

Relegation playoff
Since Manta and Patria were tied on points, a playoff was played in Cuenca to determine the last team to be relegated.

External links
1967 tournament at RSSSF

Ecuadorian Serie A seasons
1967 in Ecuadorian sport
Ecuador